Gilles Baril (born 24 March 1957) is a Canadian businessman, journalist and former politician in Quebec, Canada. He was a Parti Québécois member of the National Assembly of Quebec (MNA).

Early life and education
Born in Saint-Eugène-de-Guigues, Quebec, Baril has a B.A. in Journalism and Political Science from the University of Moncton.

Political career
He defeated incumbent Camil Samson in 1981 and became the Parti Québécois Member of the National Assembly for the district of Rouyn-Noranda–Témiscamingue at the age of 24.  He became parliamentary assistant in 1984.  In the 1985 election, he was defeated by another Gilles Baril, the candidate of the Quebec Liberal Party.

From 1990 to 1994, Baril was Director of Pavillon du Nouveau Point de vue, an addiction intervention center.  He also had a career in the media. Baril made a political comeback in 1994, when he was elected to the legislature in the district of Berthier.  He served as a parliamentary assistant and was re-elected in 1998.  From 1998 to 2002, Baril was a Member of the Cabinet of Premiers Lucien Bouchard and Bernard Landry.  He also was his party's campaign manager.

In 2002 though, he resigned and left politics, after allegations of corruption were made against him and lobbying firm Oxygène 9. From 2002 to 2005, Baril was in charge of the Hydro-Québec International office in Santiago, Chile. After Hydro Québec International, Baril is a Vice President in Quebec engineering and construction company DESSAU.

Electoral record (partial)

References

1957 births
Living people
Parti Québécois MNAs
Canadian journalists
21st-century Canadian politicians